Robert Bruce Salter  (December 15, 1924 – May 10, 2010) was a Canadian surgeon and a pioneer in the field of pediatric orthopaedic surgery.

Born in Stratford, Ontario, he graduated in medicine from the University of Toronto in 1947, worked for two years at the Grenfell Medical Mission in Newfoundland, and spent one year as the McLaughlin Fellow in Oxford, England. Salter then returned to join the medical staff at the Hospital for Sick Children in Toronto in 1955. He was later appointed surgeon-in-chief.

Salter developed a procedure to correct congenital dislocation of the hip, pioneered continuous passive motion for the treatment of joint injuries, and co- developed a classification of growth plate injuries in children, commonly known as the Salter–Harris fractures classification system. He also developed the supraacetabular innominate osteotomy (i.e. the Salter osteotomy) to treat operatively congenital dislocation of hip. His textbook of orthopaedic surgery, Disorders and Injuries of the Musculoskeletal System, is used throughout the world.

He was made an officer of the Order of Canada in 1977 and was promoted to companion in 1997. In 1988, he was awarded the Order of Ontario. In 1995 he was inducted into the Canadian Medical Hall of Fame.  He was also a fellow of the Academy of Science of the Royal Society of Canada, and received the Gairdner Foundation International Award for medical science, the FNG Starr Medal of the Canadian Medical Association and the Bristol-Myers Squibb-Zimmer Award for Distinguished Achievement in Orthopaedic Research.

Salter died on May 10, 2010.

References

External links
Robert Bruce Salter at The Canadian Encyclopedia
Biography

1924 births
2010 deaths
University of Toronto alumni
Canadian medical researchers
Canadian orthopedic surgeons
Fellows of the Royal Society of Canada
Companions of the Order of Canada
Members of the Order of Ontario
People from Stratford, Ontario
Fellows of the Royal Heraldry Society of Canada